Guilford Creek also known as "Guilford Pond Creek" is a river in Chenango County, New York. It flows into Unadilla River northwest of Sidney.

References

Rivers of New York (state)
Rivers of Chenango County, New York